Zyuganov is a Russian surname. Notable people with the surname include:

Gennady Zyuganov (born 1944), Russian politician
Valeriy Zyuganov (born 1955), Soviet and Russian biologist

Russian-language surnames